Thames Reach is a London-based charity working with those suffering from homelessness.

Services 
Thames Reach's mission is to ensure that the users of its services find and sustain a decent home, develop supportive relationships and lead fulfilling lives. 
Thames Reach's vision is of a society where street homelessness is ended and nobody need sleep rough on the streets.
Thames Reach provide a range of services to vulnerable and socially excluded people, many of whom have suffered homelessness.
The organisation's roots lie in working with rough sleepers in London and it has, since inception in 1984, considerably diversified its services and increased the number of people it supports and the range of need it actively addresses.

Thames Reach provides:
 Street outreach services including the London Street Rescue Service
 International reconnection services
 Hostels
 Specialist accommodation for people with substance misuse and mental health problems
 Tenancy support services
 Learning and employment programmes
 An Employment Academy offering a range of services to help people to find and sustain employment
 Day services offering a range of advice and assistance
 Specialist health programmes
 Services for women fleeing domestic violence

History and size 
The organisation has been in existence for over 25 years. In 2013, its 330 staff and 80 volunteers helped over 8,000 individuals across the capital.  The organisation is predominantly a frontline agency providing services to homeless people or those in danger of becoming homeless, but it is developing a strong reputation for its campaigns.

Campaigns 
Statements from the charity indicate that it believes homelessness and its effects are a great injustice. It has gone on record supporting campaigns which aim to end rough sleeping in the UK.
Its own campaigns include the following:

Super-strength drinks 
A call for super strength drinks to be taxed more heavily. Thames Reach is lobbying Government for tax changes as part of a campaign to reduce the availability of these drinks which it claims have caused devastation among marginalised and homeless people. It is also lobbying the UK drinks industry to stick to their corporate responsibility policies and to consider removing the products from sale.

Begging and drugs 
It has also campaigned on the issue of begging. It believes that, contrary to popular perception, most people who beg are not sleeping rough, and are using the money they receive to fuel a drug or alcohol addiction. It believes that these people are in need of support but that giving money to them exacerbates their problems and that the cash often ends up in the hands of drug dealers.

It achieved a great deal of publicity for its message with a poster which went up across London showing a body made up of coins alongside the message that 'Your kindness could kill'. The poster received criticism from some quarters but was seen by others as debunking some of the myths about begging and homelessness in the UK.

Young olds 
The charity launched a campaign to highlight the problems faced by the 'young olds'– vulnerable, middle aged, former rough sleepers who have debilitating health problems more commonly associated with pensioners.

Thames Reach coined the term 'young olds' to describe individuals, who may be suffering from Wernicke–Korsakoff syndrome aged between forty and their mid fifties who are typically suffering from heart disease and liver disease, brain damage, poor mobility, loss of memory and incontinence.
The problems faced by 'young olds' are caused predominantly by heavy drinking – often linked with the consumption of super strength lagers and ciders – and by years spent sleeping rough on the streets. Many engage in challenging behaviour, some have problems with hard drugs and some have mental health issues.

It now aims to influence local authorities such that they fund specialist, long-term accommodation based upon people's needs rather than their age.
Research undertaken by Thames Reach indicates that the phenomenon is a growing one and currently affects hundreds of vulnerable people across London.

See also 
 Homelessness in the United Kingdom
 Rough sleeper

External links 
 

Homelessness charities in the United Kingdom
Charities based in London